Crystal Lake Park is a Missouri Class 4 city in St. Louis County, Missouri, United States. The population was 508 at the 2020 census.

Geography
Crystal Lake Park is located at  (38.619989, -90.432321).

Demographics

2020 census
As of the 2020 census there were 508 people and 179 households living in the city. The racial makeup of the city was 79.3% White, 4.1% African American, 8.9% Asian, 1.8% from other races, and 5.5% from two or more races. Hispanic or Latino of any race were 3.5%.

2010 census
At the 2010 census there were 470 people, 202 households, and 136 families living in the city. The racial makeup of the city was 91.5% White, 2.8% African American, 4.7% Asian, 0.2% from other races, and 0.9% from two or more races. Hispanic or Latino of any race were 1.5%.

Of the 202 households 29.7% had children under the age of 18 living with them, 57.9% were married couples living together, 7.4% had a female householder with no husband present, 2.0% had a male householder with no wife present, and 32.7% were non-families. 29.2% of households were one person and 16.9% were one person aged 65 or older. The average household size was 2.33 and the average family size was 2.91.

The median age was 47.9 years. 25.3% of residents were under the age of 18; 2.4% were between the ages of 18 and 24; 16.8% were from 25 to 44; 34.4% were from 45 to 64; and 21.1% were 65 or older. The gender makeup of the city was 44.9% male and 55.1% female.

2000 census
At the 2000 census there were 457 people, 204 households, and 136 families living in the city. The racial makeup of the city was 96.72% White, 0.22% Native American, 0.66% Asian, 0.22% Pacific Islander, 0.66% from other races, and 1.53% from two or more races. Hispanic or Latino of any race were 1.31%.

Of the 204 households 28.9% had children under the age of 18 living with them, 58.8% were married couples living together, 5.4% had a female householder with no husband present, and 33.3% were non-families. 30.4% of households were one person and 14.2% were one person aged 65 or older. The average household size was 2.24 and the average family size was 2.80.

The age distribution was 21.7% under the age of 18, 3.5% from 18 to 24, 21.0% from 25 to 44, 30.4% from 45 to 64, and 23.4% 65 or older. The median age was 47 years. For every 100 females, there were 87.3 males. For every 100 females age 18 and over, there were 82.7 males.

The median household income was $78,441 and the median family income  was $91,765. Males had a median income of $61,875 versus $44,375 for females. The per capita income for the city was $55,596. About 2.3% of families and 3.1% of the population were below the poverty line, including 3.1% of those under age 18 and 2.6% of those age 65 or over.

References

External links
 Crystal Lake Park official website

Cities in St. Louis County, Missouri
Cities in Missouri